Gandaberunda or Bheruṇḍa (Sanskrit: भेरुण्ड, lit. terrible) is a two-headed bird in Hindu mythology which was taken by the Hindu God Vishnu, It is believed to possess immense magical strength.Vaishnava traditions hold it to be a form of Vishnu to fight Sharabha (In Shaiva tradition, Sharabha is a form of Shiva taken to pacify Vishnu's Narasimha avatar).

Depiction
The bird is generally depicted as clutching elephants in its talons and beaks, demonstrating its immense strength. In a coin [Kasu] found in Madurai, it is shown holding a snake in its beak. All 2-dimensional depictions show a symmetrical image similar to the double-headed eagle while other images show the long tail feathers resembling a peacock. In the Chennakeshava temple of Belur, Karnataka, Gandaberunda, the two faced bird is carved as a scene of "chain of destruction" result in destruction of the universe. The Gandaberunda was later identified as a secondary form taken by Narasimha, the fourth avatar of Vishnu. It is mentioned by several Hindu scriptures.

Legend 
After Narasimha had slain the asura king Hiranyakashipu, he drank his blood, but his fury did not subside. According to the original iterations of this legend, the asura's son Prahlada was able to pacify the wrath of Narasimha with the recitation of moving prayers, after which the latter returned to Vaikuntha. However, Shaiva traditions made retroactive alterations to this tale, seeking to establish the supremacy of Shiva. The gods, (devas) fearing that Narasimha might destroy the cosmos in his fury, approached the deity Shiva for help.  In order to protect creation, Shiva took his Virabhadra form to beseech Narasimha to see reason, but Narasimha ignored this appeal. So, he then took the form of Sharabha or Sharabheswara, a part-lion and part-bird beast. He fought Narasimha in combat, while  Sharabha tried to hold Narasimha and carry him high into the sky, Narasimha took the form of a two-headed eagle - Gandaberunda -  who was even stronger than Sharabha, and now with renewed rage. After hot pursuit, when Gandaberunda met Sharabha, a fierce 18-day long battle ensued between them. On the eighteenth day, Gandhaberunda defeated Sharabha and tore him into shreds, Shiva them pleaded and appealed to Vishnu to forgive him for his actions and as a consequence, snapped out of his fury and restored Narasimha's sense of calm. As a mark of respect to Vishnu, Sharabha removed the skin of his body and presented it to Gandaberunda. Both Vishnu and Shiva then returned to their abodes.

Usage 
The Gandaberunda was the emblem of the erstwhile Kingdom of Mysore under the Wodeyar kings, and after India attained independence, it was retained by the Mysore state as its emblem. The aforementioned state was enlarged in 1956 and renamed Karnataka in 1973, and the Gandabherunda continues to be the official state emblem of Karnataka. It is used as the official emblem of the Karnataka state government. It is believed to represent resilience against the forces of destruction. It appears as an intricately carved sculpture motif in Hindu temples.

A sculpture depicting a Gandaberunda is found on the roof of the Rameshwara temple in the temple town of Keladi in Shimoga District, the capital of the Keladi Nayakas. The Gandaberunda was also used by the Wodeyar dynasty of Mysore as the Royal emblem. The Karnataka Government adopted this symbol as the state symbol and can be found on bus terminals and tickets issued by Karnataka State Road Transport Corporation. Coins(Gold pagoda or gadyana) from the rule of Achyuta Deva Raya are thought to be the first to use the Gandaberunda on currency. The crest of the Indian navy ship INS Mysore (D60) features a Gandaberunda.

In popular culture
Ganda Berunda is a Kannada film directed by S. V. Rajendrasingh Babu and produced by Vajramuni. The playwright of the movie was the celebrated writer, late H V Subba Rao. The film was released in the year 1984. The music was composed by Sathyam. Bollywood actor Amrish Puri played the antagonist in the film.

See also 
 Double-headed eagle
 Yali
 Garuda

References

External links 

 "Evolution of Gandabherunda" -article by S. Srikanta Sastri
 http://digitalcommons.unl.edu/cgi/viewcontent.cgi?article=1001&context=iqsc4symp
 A historical and unique sculpture of Gandaberunda or berunda from Balligavi: 

Legendary birds
Hindu legendary creatures
Heraldic birds
Indian legendary creatures
Forms of Vishnu